WKII (1070 AM) is a radio station broadcasting a sports format. Licensed to Solana, Florida, United States, the station serves the greater Charlotte County area, but can be heard as far north as Tampa and as far south as Key West. The station is currently owned by iHeartMedia, Inc. The station was founded in 1986 by Kneller Broadcasting of Charlotte County. Under the leadership of Kneller Broadcasting, WKII was a full service radio station with major community involvement. Former air personalities include Jack Mihall (now deceased), Charlie Shoe and Larry Timko.

Previous logo
 (WKII's logo under previous NBC Sports Radio affiliation)

References

External links

KII
IHeartMedia radio stations
1986 establishments in Florida
Radio stations established in 1986
Fox Sports Radio stations